Harry S. Truman High School was located in Taylor, Michigan in Metro Detroit. It was opened in 1973 as a combined High School and Middle School. The original school physical plant was designed using the Open School concept, which meant they had classrooms with no walls. But after several years of operating using that concept and a configuration as a combined senior/middle school, Taylor School District leaders decided to change the school into a stand-alone high school. In addition, district leaders began the process of installing walls within the building, creating individual classroom that continue to be the current school configuration today.  Truman High School has been renamed Taylor High School in Fall 2018, following the Spring 2018 closure of Kennedy High School.  Because of the closure, Kennedy's 2017-18 freshman class was transferred to Truman High School.  As part of the renaming, school colors have been changed to black and gold, and the athletics teams will become the Griffins.

The school served portions of Taylor, Dearborn Heights, Inkster, and Westland.

Clubs

 Art Club
 Game Club
 Key Club
Drama Club

Organizations
Homecoming
 Prom
 SADD
 Student Council
 Year Book
 National Honor Society
 Newspaper
 JROTC
 DECA
 Broadcasting

References

External links

Educational institutions in the United States with year of establishment missing
Defunct schools in Michigan
Schools in Wayne County, Michigan
Educational institutions established in 1971
1971 establishments in Michigan
Educational institutions disestablished in 2018
2018 disestablishments in Michigan
Taylor, Michigan